Armenia participated in the Eurovision Song Contest 2018 with the song "Qami" written by Sevak Khanagyan, Anna Danielyan and Viktorya Maloyan. The song was performed by Sevak Khanagyan. The Armenian entry for the 2018 contest in Lisbon, Portugal was selected through the national final Depi Evratesil 2018, organised by the Armenian broadcaster Public Television of Armenia (AMPTV). The national final and consisted of three shows: two semi-finals and a final. Ten entries competed in each semi-final with the top five from each semi-final qualifying to compete in the final on 25 February 2018. "Qami" performed by Sevak Khanagyan was selected as the winner following the combination of votes from an international jury and a public televote.

Armenia was drawn to compete in the first semi-final of the Eurovision Song Contest which took place on 8 May 2018. Performing during the show in position 16, "Qami" was not announced among the top 10 entries of the first semi-final and therefore did not qualify to compete in the final. It was later revealed that Armenia placed fifteenth out of the 19 participating countries in the semi-final with 79 points.

Background 

Prior to the 2018 contest, Armenia had participated in the Eurovision Song Contest eleven times since its first entry in 2006. Its highest placing in the contest, to this point, has been fourth place, which the nation achieved on two occasions: in 2008 with the song "Qélé, Qélé" performed by Sirusho and in 2014 with the song "Not Alone" performed by Aram Mp3. Armenia had, to this point, failed to qualify to the final on only one occasion in 2011. The nation briefly withdrew from the contest in 2012 due to long-standing tensions with then host country Azerbaijan. In 2017, "Fly with Me" performed by Artsvik placed eighteenth in the final.

The Armenian national broadcaster, Public Television of Armenia (AMPTV), broadcasts the event within Armenia and organises the selection process for the nation's entry. AMPTV confirmed their intentions to participate at the 2018 Eurovision Song Contest on 27 October 2017. Armenia has used various methods to select the Armenian entry in the past, such as a live televised national final to choose the performer, song or both to compete at Eurovision. However internal selections have also been held on occasion. Between 2014 and 2016, the broadcaster internally selected both the artist and the song. The broadcaster opted to organize a national final titled Depi Evratesil to select the Armenian performer for the 2017 contest, with the song being internally selected. However, AMPTV announced along with their participation confirmation that Depi Evratesil would once again be organized but would select both the artist and the song for the 2018 contest.

Before Eurovision

Depi Evratesil 2018 
Depi Evratesil 2018 (Towards Eurovision 2018) was the second edition of the national final Depi Evratesil and selected the Armenian entry for the Eurovision Song Contest 2018. The competition commenced on 19 February 2018 with the first of two semi-finals and concluded with a winning song and artist during the final on 25 February 2018. All shows in the competition took place at the AMPTV studios in Yerevan, hosted by Gohar Gasparyan and broadcast on Armenia 1 as well as online via the broadcaster's website 1tv.am.

Format 
The national final took place over three stages and consisted of three shows. The first stage was a submission period where artists and songwriters had the opportunity to apply by submitting their entries online. Twenty entries were selected to proceed to the second stage of the competition. The second stage consisted of the semi-finals which took place on 19 and 22 December 2018 with ten entries competing in each show. The top five from each semi-final proceeded to the third stage, the final which took place on 25 February 2018. In the final, the winner was selected from the remaining ten entries. The results of each of the three shows were determined by the 50/50 combination of votes from an international jury panel and a public vote. The public were able to cast their votes via SMS, and both the public and jury vote developed an overall ranking which were converted to points from 1-8, 10 and 12 and assigned to the competing entries.

Competing entries 
On 27 October 2017, AMPTV announced an online submission period with a deadline of 15 December 2017. Artists were required to be aged at least 16 and are of Armenian citizenship or heritage, and were also required to submit a cover version of another song along with their entry submission. Songwriters worldwide were able to submit songs. The broadcaster received more than 100 entries at the closing of the deadline. A jury panel selected twenty entries to proceed to the national final, which were announced on 27 December 2017. Among the competing artists was Tamar Kaprelian who represented Armenia in the Eurovision Song Contest 2015 as part of the group Genealogy.

Shows

Semi-finals 
Two semi-finals took place on 19 and 22 February 2018. In each semi-final ten entries competed and the top five qualified to the final by the 50/50 combination of votes from a six-member international jury and a public vote. In addition to the performances of the competing entries, the interval acts featured Armenian 2017 Junior Eurovision entrant Misha with "Boomerang" in semi-final 1, and Syuzanna Melqonyan with "Euphoria", "Rise Like a Phoenix" and "1944" in semi-final 2.

Final 
The final took place on 25 February 2018. The ten entries that qualified from the preceding two semi-finals competed and the winner, "Qami" performed by Sevak Khanagyan, was selected by the 50/50 combination of votes from a nine-member international jury and a public vote. In addition to the performances of the competing entries, the interval act featured Armenian 2017 Eurovision entrant Artsvik with "Fly with Me" and "No Fear".

Preparation 
Sevak Khanagyan filmed the official video for "Qami" following his win at Depi Evratesil 2018, which was directed by Arthur Manukyan and featured fashion designs by Aram Nikolyan. The video was previewed on 16 March and released via the official Eurovision Song Contest's YouTube channel on 21 March 2018.

Promotion 
Sevak Khanagyan made several appearances across Europe to specifically promote "Qami" as the Armenian Eurovision entry. On 7 April, Sevak Khanagyan performed during the Eurovision Pre-Party, which was held at the VEGAS Kuntsevo shopping mall in Moscow, Russia. Between 8 and 11 April, Khanagyan took part in promotional activities in Tel Aviv, Israel and performed during the Israel Calling event held at the Rabin Square. On 14 April, Khanagyan performed during the Eurovision in Concert event which was held at the AFAS Live venue in Amsterdam, Netherlands and hosted by Edsilia Rombley and Cornald Maas. Khanagyan also performed during the ESPreParty event on 21 April which was held at the Sala La Riviera venue in Madrid, Spain and hosted by Soraya Arnelas.

At Eurovision 
All countries except the "Big Five" (France, Germany, Italy, Spain and the United Kingdom), and the host country, are required to qualify from one of two semi-finals in order to compete for the final; the top ten countries from each semi-final progress to the final. The European Broadcasting Union (EBU) split up the competing countries into six different pots based on voting patterns from previous contests, with countries with favourable voting histories put into the same pot. On 29 January 2018, a special allocation draw was held which placed each country into one of the two semi-finals, as well as which half of the show they would perform in. Armenia was placed into the first semi-final, to be held on 8 May 2018, and was scheduled to perform in the second half of the show.

Once all the competing songs for the 2018 contest had been released, the running order for the semi-finals was decided by the shows' producers rather than through another draw, so that similar songs were not placed next to each other. Armenia was set to perform in position 16, following the entry from Finland and before the entry from Switzerland.

In Armenia, the two semi-finals and the final were broadcast on Armenia 1 and Public Radio of Armenia with commentary by Avet Barseghyan and Felix Khachatryan. The Armenian spokesperson, who announced the top 12-point score awarded by the Armenian jury during the final, was Arsen Grigoryan.

Semi-final
 
Sevak Khanagyan took part in technical rehearsals on 2 and 6 May, followed by dress rehearsals on 9 and 10 May. This included the jury show on 9 May where the professional juries of each country watched and voted on the competing entries.

The Armenian performance featured Sevak Khanagyan wearing a long gray jacket performing alone on stage and surrounded by monoliths in various heights. The stage lighting displayed white colours before transitioning to red and white. Sevak Khanagyan was joined by five off-stage backing vocalists: Arevik Grigoryan, Julieta Grigoryan, Mnats Khanagyan, Monika Manucharova and Sevak Musakhanyan. Monika Manucharova previously represented Armenia in the Junior Eurovision Song Contest in 2008.

At the end of the show, Armenia was not announced among the top 10 entries in the first semi-final and therefore failed to qualify to compete in the final. It was later revealed that Armenia placed fifteenth in the semi-final, receiving a total of 79 points: 41 points from the televoting and 38 points from the juries.

Voting
Voting during the three shows involved each country awarding two sets of points from 1-8, 10 and 12: one from their professional jury and the other from televoting. Each nation's jury consisted of five music industry professionals who are citizens of the country they represent, with their names published before the contest to ensure transparency. This jury judged each entry based on: vocal capacity; the stage performance; the song's composition and originality; and the overall impression by the act. In addition, no member of a national jury was permitted to be related in any way to any of the competing acts in such a way that they cannot vote impartially and independently. The individual rankings of each jury member as well as the nation's televoting results were released shortly after the grand final.

Below is a breakdown of points awarded to Armenia and awarded by Armenia in the first semi-final and grand final of the contest, and the breakdown of the jury voting and televoting conducted during the two shows:

Points awarded to Armenia

Points awarded by Armenia

Detailed voting results
The following members comprised the Armenian jury:
  (Aramo; jury chairperson)singer, actor
 Alla Levonyansinger, composer
 Armen Galyanstylist, fashion editor
 Masha Mnjoyansinger
 Shushanik Arevshatyanproducer

References

2018
Countries in the Eurovision Song Contest 2018
Eurovision